The 1977 Women's Junior World Handball Championship was the first edition of the Women's Junior World Handball Championship with the tournament taking place in Romania from 30 September to 7 October 1977.

Fourteen teams competed in the competition with almost all of the teams bar Congo coming from the European continent. After finishing top of the second round groups, Yugoslavia became the first nation to win the title as they defeated the Soviet Union 16-13 in the final. Romania came in third place after they defeated East Germany by a single goal in the third-place playoff.

Group stage

Group A

Group B

Group C

Group D

Placement round

Group I

Group II

Group III

Group IV

Placement matches

Thirteenth place game

Eleventh place game

Ninth place game

Seventh place game

Fifth place game

Third place game

Final

Ranking

References

External links 

International handball competitions hosted by Romania
Women's Junior World Handball Championship, 2010
1977
Women's Junior World Handball Championship
Women's Junior World Handball Championship
Women's handball in Romania